Miomantis binotata, the African pinstripe mantis, is a small species of praying mantis found in Africa that are bred in captivity in the pet trade.

Description

Range
Kenya, Malawi, Rwanda, Tanzania, Togo (?), Burundi. Musina, South Africa.

Additional images

See also
List of mantis genera and species

References

binotata
Mantodea of Africa
Insects of Kenya
Insects of Tanzania